The Theodore von Karman Medal in Engineering Mechanics is awarded annually to an individual in recognition of his distinguished achievement in engineering mechanics, applicable to any branch of civil engineering. This award was established and endowed in 1960 in honor of Theodore von Kármán by the Engineering Mechanics Division of the American Society of Civil Engineers (ASCE).

List of recipients
Source: ASCE

See also
List of engineering awards
List of prizes named after people

References

Awards established in 1960
Awards of the American Society of Civil Engineers